Tyrrell County Courthouse is a historic courthouse building located at Columbia, Tyrrell County, North Carolina.  It was built in 1903, and is a two-story, Italianate style brick building with a hipped roof. It has gabled, parapetted wall dormers; windows with segmental and round arches; and flat roof porch supported by paired columns dated to the 1970s.

It was listed on the National Register of Historic Places in 1979.  It is located in the Columbia Historic District.

References

County courthouses in North Carolina
Courthouses on the National Register of Historic Places in North Carolina
Italianate architecture in North Carolina
Government buildings completed in 1903
Buildings and structures in Tyrrell County, North Carolina
National Register of Historic Places in Tyrrell County, North Carolina
Individually listed contributing properties to historic districts on the National Register in North Carolina
1903 establishments in North Carolina